Gregory River is a coastal rural locality in the Whitsunday Region, Queensland, Australia.

References 

Whitsunday Region
Localities in Queensland
Coastline of Queensland